Wālī (alternatively Balel, Balil, Vali) is a village in Kandahar Province, in southern Afghanistan.

See also
Kandahar Province

References

Populated places in Kandahar Province